The end of history is a political and philosophical concept that supposes that a particular political, economic, or social system may develop that would constitute the end-point of humanity's sociocultural evolution and the final form of human government. 

End of history or The End of History may also refer to:

 "The End of History?", 1989 essay by Francis Fukuyama on the political and philosophical concept, published in The National Interest
 The End of History and the Last Man, 1992 political book by Fukuyama expanding on his 1989 essay
 The End of History (album), a 2006 album by Fionn Regan
 End-of-history illusion, a psychological illusion that one will not undergo significant developmental changes in the future
 The End of History, a 55% ABV beer made by the BrewDog brewery and packaged inside small stuffed animals
 Norte, the End of History, 2013 Filipino drama film

See also
 End of the world (disambiguation)